Alex Soroka (born 19 February 2001) is an Irish rugby union player, currently playing for United Rugby Championship and European Rugby Champions Cup side Leinster Rugby, and represents Clontarf in the All-Ireland League. His preferred position is flanker.

Leinster
Soroka played under-age rugby with Clontarf F.C. He was named in the Leinster academy for the 2020–21 season. He made his Leinster debut in Round 13 of the 2020–21 Pro14 against .

Personal life
He was born in Cork to Ukrainian parents, Tanya and Vassyl. He has an older brother, Ivan, who also plays for Clontarf F.C., and a younger sister, Dasha. With his extended family living in Ukraine, following the 2022 Russian invasion of Ukraine, Soroka has been involved in fundraising for Okhmadits Childrens Hospital in Kyiv, the largest children's hospital in Ukraine. His fundraising efforts were backed by his Leinster teammates, and  his GoFundMe has raised over €64,000.

References

External links
itsrugby.co.uk Profile

2001 births
Living people
Irish rugby union players
Irish people of Ukrainian descent
Leinster Rugby players
Rugby union flankers
Rugby union players from Cork (city)
People educated at Belvedere College